Wufeng Township is a mountain indigenous township in Hsinchu County, Taiwan.

It had an estimated population of 4,515 as of February 2023. 
The population is mainly of the indigenous Atayal people and Saisiyat people.

Administrative divisions

The township comprises four villages: Daai, Huayuan, Taoshan and Zhulin.

Tourist attractions
 Guanwu National Forest Recreation Area
 Pas-ta'ai ceremonial ground
 Former Residence of Chang Hsüeh-liang

References

External links

  

Townships in Hsinchu County